Rueda is a Spanish Denominación de Origen Protegida (DOP) for wines located in the Community of Castile and León. It comprises 72 municipalities, of which 53 are in the province of Valladolid, 17 are in the north of the province of Segovia, and 2 are in the north of the province of Ávila. It is one of Spain's leading wine regions, and is known primarily for its white wines based on the Verdejo grape.

History

The first documentary evidence of wine production in this area dates from the 11th century, when King Alfonso VI offered title to lands to settlers in the recently reconquered area. Many individuals and monastic orders accepted the offer and founded monasteries with their own vineyards.

During the 18th century the land planted to vines was greater in extent than it is now and was exclusively under the Verdejo grape variety. The wines produced enjoyed great commercial success in part due to the clarification process used which involved the use of local clay.

In the years between 1890 and 1922 the phylloxera louse destroyed over two thirds of the vines, which were replanted by grafting onto louse resistant New World rootstock. However, the new varieties were selected according to productivity criteria rather than quality ones and for many years the wine produced was sold in bulk.

The idea of creating a DO was first raised in 1935 but it was not until 1972 that major investment by the Rioja winery, Marqués de Riscal, signalled the start of a second era of quality wine production, again based on the Verdejo variety. Official DO status was acquired in 1980.

Geography

The DO encompasses an area of 16,165 hectares and is centered around the town of Rueda, in the province of Valladolid about 170 km northwest of Madrid. The land is a flat high plain at an altitude of between 600 and 780 m above sea level. The Duero River flows through the area from east to west.

Climate
The climate is continental (long hot summers, cold winters) with a certain Atlantic maritime influences. Temperatures vary widely and can drop below zero in winter (-1 °C) and can reach 30 °C in summer, which is not as high as similar wine-producing regions in southern Central Spain. There is a risk of frost, freezing fog, high winds and hailstones in winter/spring. On the other hand there is only a very small possibility of drought.

Normally it rains in spring and autumn, with an average rainfall of 400 mm/year, while the vines receive 2,700 hours of sunlight per year.

Soils
Close to the River Duero the soils are alluvial with a high lime content (max 24%). To the south the topsoil is brown and sandy with a gravel and clay subsoil. Drainage is good, has a rich iron content and is easy to plough.

Grape varieties
 The authorized white varieties are: Verdejo, Viura, Sauvignon blanc, and Palomino Fino. More recently foreign varieties such as  Viognier and Chardonnay have been approved as well.
 The authorised red varieties are: Tempranillo, Cabernet Sauvignon, Merlot, Syrah and Garnacha.

The authorized yield for white varieties is 8,000 kg/ha (10,000 kg/ha if on trellises) though in practice the yields are only between one quarter and one half of this level. Most new vineyards are planted with rows at 3 m intervals to allow mechanization. Irrigation is only allowed under special circumstances. Vines are often trained close to the ground to resist the strong winds that are characteristic of the area.

See also
Spanish wine
Cuisine of Valladolid

References

External links
 D.O. Rueda official website

Wine regions of Spain
Province of Valladolid